Raye Birk (born May 27, 1943, Flint, Michigan) is an American film and television actor best known for a variety of roles, such as playing the role of Pahpshmir in the first and last of the Naked Gun movies, and a variety of television appearances where he played very unique characters each time, including The Wonder Years, The Golden Girls, Wings, and Cheers, well known for portraying the character of mailman Walt Twitchell in the latter.

Career 
Birk appeared as the main villain in Naked Gun : The Final Insult. He has also guest starred in Due South as the terrorist Francis Bolt in the Episodes "All the Queens Horses", "Red, White and Blue", "Call of the Wild Part One" and "Call of the Wild Part Two". He also had roles in the  X-Files and Babylon 5. His other film credits include roles in Best Defense (1984), Amazon Women on the Moon (1987), Throw Momma from the Train (1987), Doc Hollywood (1991) and Star Trek: Insurrection (1998).

In addition to these roles, he had a frequently occurring role as the assistant principal Mr. Diperna on The Wonder Years; starting with the pilot episode, when he had a conference with Kevin Arnold's parents for throwing food in the cafeteria. (He originally read for the role of Coach Ed Cutlip). While generally antagonist, a more sympathetic role on the show was seen in the award winning episode "Goodbye" where he confides in Kevin that he is Kevin's new math teacher as Kevin's hardnosed algebra teacher has just died. He also was on a pair of Home Improvement episodes as one of Tim's poker buddies. Raye appeared in several episodes on the TV series Night Court.  He appeared twice on The Golden Girls, both times playing a wedding caterer.

Furthermore, in 1985, 1986 and 1992, he appeared in three episodes of Cheers as Walt Twitchell, a mailman who got into minor altercations with Cliff Clavin.  Birk reprised the role of Twitchell in a 2002 episode of the Cheers spinoff series, Frasier, in which the title character (played by Kelsey Grammer) returned to Boston and re-acquainted himself with old friends from the bar.  He played a recurring role on Coach as university band director Riley Pringle from 1989 to 1993. He also appeared in an episode of Mr. Belvedere as an accordion player.

From 2004 to 2008, he played Ebenezer Scrooge in A Christmas Carol at the Guthrie Theater in Minneapolis.

Filmography

Film

Television

References

External links

1943 births
American male film actors
American male television actors
Male actors from Michigan
Actors from Flint, Michigan
Living people
Jewish American male actors
21st-century American male actors
20th-century American male actors